Persian Percussion Electrified is the third studio album by Ramin Rahimi, drummer for the power metal act Angband. The album was released on November 19, 2012, through ARC Music. It features Mahyar Dean and Farshad Shokuhfar from Angband as well as many other professional  musicians.

Track listing

Personnel 
Ramin Rahimi - Drums and percussions
Farshad Shokuhfar - Bass
Mahyar Dean - Electric Guitar
Reza Darbandi - Santour, Barbat
Milad Derakhshani - Tar
Farid Raoufi - Acoustic Guitar
Pouria Zarrabi - Flamenco Guitar
Homayoun Poshtdar - Kamancheh
Parsa Ehteshami - Ney
Sohrab Darabi - Congas
Mohsen Sharifian - Ney-Anban
Ehsan Abdi Pour - Sorna
Nazanin Rahimi - Soprano
Nazanin Zahedi - Soprano
Taraneh Saeedi - Soprano
Produced by Ramin Rahimi and Mahyar Dean
Recorded at Rahgozar studio, Tehran
 Sound engineered by Soheil Saeedi
 Mixed by Farshad Shokuhfar
 Mastered by Diz Heller
 Cover design by Sara Ash

References

External links 
ARC Music
 Ramin Rahimi on Facebook
 Angband on Facebook

2012 albums
Ramin Rahimi albums